The Bikélé are an ethnic group living mainly in the south-west of Cameroon, in the department of Haut-Nyong, sub-division of Messamena. They are closely related to the Badjoué.

Language 
The Bikélé speak the kol language (also known as Bikélé), a southern Bantoid language.

References

Bibliography 

 Dictionnaire des villages du Haut-Nyong, Centre ORSTOM de Yaoundé, June 1968, 84 p. (identification of Bikélé villages)
 H. Koch, "Le petit bétail chez les Badjoué et Bikélé de Messamena", in Bulletin de la Société d'études camerounaises, 1946, Numbers: 13-14, 
 Henri Koch, Magie et chasse au Cameroun (Paris: Berger-Levrault, 1968) [a study of the culture of Badjoué and Bikélé peoples].

See also 

 Ethnic groups in Cameroon

Ethnic groups in Cameroon